Netherlands Practical Shooting Association, Dutch Nederlandse Parcours Schutters Associatie is the Dutch association for practical shooting under the International Practical Shooting Confederation.

See also 
 Netherlands Royal Shooting Sport Association

References

External links 
 Official homepage of the Netherlands Practical Shooting Association

Regions of the International Practical Shooting Confederation
Sports organisations of the Netherlands